Turn and Burn: The F-14 Dogfight Simulator is a modern jet flight simulation developed by  Imagineering Inc. and released in 1992 for the Game Boy in Europe and North America. In Europe, the game was released as the Game Boy adaptation of Phantom Air Mission, the European version of Imagineering's previous flight simulator Flight of the Intruder. A sequel, Turn and Burn: No-Fly Zone, was later released for the Super NES.

Gameplay

See also
Top Gun: Guts and Glory

References

External links
Turn and Burn: The F-14 Dogfight Simulator at MobyGames
Phantom Air Mission at Giant Bomb
Turn and Burn: The F-14 Dogfight Simulator at The Game Boy Database

1992 video games
Absolute Entertainment games
Activision games
Imagineering (company) games
Combat flight simulators
Game Boy-only games
Game Boy games
Video games developed in the United States
Single-player video games